was a Japanese daimyō of the late Sengoku period through early Edo period, who was a retainer of the Oda and Toyotomi clans. Kazumasa took part in many of the major campaigns of the Toyotomi clan, serving as a yoriki under his brother-in-law Gamō Ujisato. In the early Edo period, he served under the Tokugawa clan at the Sieges of Osaka. His domain of Kurosaka was confiscated in 1618, due to internal disturbances. Kazumasa died in 1625, but his nephew and adoptive son Ujimori was granted 5,000 koku and allowed to succeed to family headship as a high-ranking hatamoto.

References
Fukuda, Chizuru (2005). Oie-sōdō. Tokyo: Chūōkōron-shinsha.
 "Ise-Kameyama han" on Edo 300 HTML (19 February 2008)

|-

|-

Daimyo
1564 births
1625 deaths